The 1975 AFC Women's Championship, officially known as the Asian Cup Ladies Football Tournament is the first edition of the AFC Women's Championship. It was held from 25 August to 3 September 1975 in Hong Kong. Participating members were New Zealand, Thailand, Australia, Hong Kong, Singapore, Malaysia. The tournament was won by New Zealand in the final against Thailand.

Venue
All matches were held at the Government Stadium in Hong Kong.

Entrants

Notes
The majority of the 1975 Australian players belonged to the St George club which had an unbeaten run of 7 years. We needed to get and received official permission from the mens ASF to represent Australia and wear the green and gold jersey with the embroidered Coat of Arms.  Nine of our players had represented New South Wales and won the 1974 Australian National championships undefeated. NSW also won the Nationals in 1976,77,79,80 and 1981 with quite a few of our 1975 players. Pat O'Connor was our Captain and Joe O'Connor was our Coach.

Group stage

Group A

Group B

Knock-out stage

Semi-finals

Third place play-off

Final

Winner

References

External links
 RSSSF.com
 History of New Zealand Women’s Soccer
 NZ Soccer 1975 Asian Cup

Women's Championship
AFC Women's Asian Cup tournaments
International association football competitions hosted by Hong Kong
Afc
AFC
AFC Women's Championship
AFC Women's Championship
AFC Championship